Lattimore can refer to:

 Lattimore, North Carolina

People
 Cedrick Lattimore (born 1998), American football player
 DeDe Lattimore (born 1991), American football player
 Harlan Lattimore (1908–1980), singer with various jazz orchestras
 Kenny Lattimore (born 1970), American rhythm and blues singer
 Jonita Lattimore, American soprano
 Marcus Lattimore, American football player
 Marshon Lattimore, American football player
 The children of David and Margaret Barnes Lattimore:
 Owen Lattimore (1900–1989), American educator, author and target of Sen. Joseph McCarthy
 Eleanor Frances Lattimore (1904–1986), American author and illustrator of children's books 
 Richmond Lattimore (1906–1984), American poet and translator of the Iliad and Odyssey
 Sir Lattimore Brown (1931–2011), American R&B singer